2 is the second album by the Los Angeles band Darker My Love. Recorded primarily at Sunset Sound Recorders in Los Angeles, with additional recording at Sage & Sound, The Boat, Sonora and Westbeach Recorders, it is the first with Will Canzoneri on organ and clavinet. It was released on 5 August 2008. The artwork for the album was by the lead guitarist/vocalist Tim Presley. Several of the songs on 2 had previously been performed live in a different arrangement under various working titles, appearing on the set of live albums that Darker My Love recorded during their Spaceland residency in 2006.

The album, produced by Dave Cooley and mixed by Tony Hoffer, peaked at #41 on the heatseekers album chart.

Track listing
The band simultaneously released two different versions of the album, on CD and double LP, with different track listings. The LP version also has the track "Pharoah Sanders' Tomb".

CD version

LP version

Personnel
 Tim Presley – vocals/guitar
 Rob Barbato – vocals/bass guitar
 Jared Everett – guitar
 Will Canzoneri – organ/clavinet
 Andy Granelli – drums
 Orpheo McCord – percussion (on "Even in Your Lightest Day")
 Stephanie O'Keefe – French horn
 Bruce Otto – tenor and bass trombone
 The Section Quartet – strings
 Eric Gorfain – violin
 Daphne Chen – violin
 Leah Katz – viola
 Richard Dodd – cello
 Timm Boatman – bells
 Steven Rhodes – shaker (on "Northern Soul")

Production and design
 Produced by Dave Cooley
 Mixed by Tony Hoffer
 Engineered by Steven Rhodes
 Mastered by Alan Yoshida
 Strings and brass on "All The Hurry & Wait" arranged by Will Canzoneri
 Artwork by Tim Presley
 Layout by Sara Cummings
 A&R – Jeff Castelaz and Peter Walker
 Management – Dangerbird

References

External links
 Dangerbird Records - Album release information
 2 on Rdio
 2 on Spotify
 
 
 
 

2008 albums
Darker My Love albums
Dangerbird Records albums